Ytterdalsegga ("The outer valley ridge") is a mountain ridge in Nordenskiöld Land at Spitsbergen, Svalbard. It has a length of about seven kilometers, and is located between the valley of Ytterdalen and the glacier of Fridtjovbreen. The highest peaks on the ridge are Foldtinden (736 m.a.s.l.) and Eggtinden (720 m.a.s.l.).

References

Mountains of Spitsbergen